Shittu may refer to

Amusa Shittu (1937–2012), Nigerian footballer
Daniel Shittu (born 1980), Nigerian footballer 
Shittu Alao (born 1937), Nigerian Air Force's Chief of the Air Staff 
Simisola Shittu (born 1999), British-born Canadian basketball player
Sulley Shittu (born 1946), Ghanaian boxer of the 1960s and '70s